New Independent Fundamentalist Baptist churches (also known as the New IFB) or officially the New Independent Fundamental Baptist Movement are an association of conservative, King James Only, independent Baptist churches. The New IFB began with Steven Anderson of Faithful Word Baptist Church in response to perceived liberalism in other independent Baptist churches. The New IFB does not consider itself to be a denomination. As of 2019, the New IFB listed 32 affiliated congregations on its website, most in the U.S. with some in Australia, Canada, the Philippines and South Africa. 

New IFB churches have caused controversy on several occasions, because of their opposition to homosexuality. They are described by the Anti-Defamation League (ADL) as "a loose network of independent churches concentrated in the U.S. connected by their belief in certain religious doctrines and a shared brand of deeply anti-LGBTQ and antisemitic teachings." According to the ADL "Anti-LGBTQ bigotry and antisemitism are fundamental to New IFB ideology, as demonstrated by the doctrinal statements on their websites and the content of their sermons."

History 
The New IFB was formed by Anderson and other Baptist pastors in 2017 in an attempt to revive what they perceived older independent Baptist churches once represented.

A split in the New IFB occurred in January 2019, after Donnie Romero, pastor at Stedfast Baptist Church-Fort Worth (SBC), resigned after it was revealed he had hired prostitutes, smoked marijuana and gambled.  Adam Fannin, the lead preacher at SBC's Jacksonville satellite campus, refused to acknowledge the authority of Jonathan Shelley, another Texas New IFB pastor who took over SBC–Fort Worth following Romero's resignation. Anderson, Fannin and Shelley traded accusations of financial wrongdoing and running a cult. Fannin was later ejected as the lead preacher of SBC-Jax.

In 2021, the NIFB-affiliated First Works Baptist Church in El Monte, California was bombed with an improvised explosive device. The explosion caused property damage but no injuries or deaths. First Works had previously been the site of protests by activists opposed to its anti-LGBTQ teachings, but police reported there was no evidence linking the protesters to the bombing.

Size 
The New IFB currently lists 30 affiliated congregations on their website. 22 of the congregations are in 16 U.S. states, one in British Columbia, three are in the Philippines, two are in the Australian states of New South Wales and Queensland, and one congregation is located in the South African town of Middelburg.

Beliefs 
The New IFB website states that it is not a denomination and that New IFB pastors have differing views over minor theological issues. However, the churches are united by a number of doctrines. The New IFB's website lists its core doctrines as salvation by faith alone, once saved always saved, King James Bible-only, the Trinity, soul-winning, "hard" preaching, prewrath post-tribulation rapture, and opposition of worldliness, Calvinism, dispensationalism, liberalism, and Zionism.

Despite the website's claims that each church is independent, some followers and former followers of the New IFB have accused Anderson of having complete control over the organization and ejecting anyone who has a minor disagreement with him.

Controversies 
New IFB pastors have been the subjects of controversy on numerous occasions. The New IFB is strongly opposed to homosexuality, with several pastors advocating the belief that homosexuals should be executed by the government. Anderson and other New IFB pastors have praised the Orlando gay nightclub shooting. On the weekend of the third anniversary of the shooting, the New IFB held a "Make America Straight Again" conference at an Orlando-area New IFB church. Also in June 2019, Grayson Fritts, pastor at New IFB-affiliated All Scripture Baptist Church and a former detective for the Knox County, Tennessee, Sheriff's Office, delivered a sermon calling for the execution of gays. 

The New IFB considers the modern nation of Israel to be a fraud and it also teaches that Christians rather than Jews are God's chosen people. Anderson has also produced videos in which he attacks the religion of Judaism and questions the official account of the Holocaust.

Auckland, New Zealand, New IFB pastor Logan Robertson was deported from Australia in July 2018 after being accused of harassing Muslims at two Brisbane mosques. Robertson had previously attracted media attention after he stated that gay people should be shot and New Zealand prime minister Jacinda Ardern should "go home and get in the kitchen".

Tarrant County, Texas preacher Dillon Awes attracted considerable controversy for advocating that "every single homosexual" in America be lined up against a wall and shot in the back of the head. This led to calls to evict Stedfast Baptist Church from its location at a strip mall in Watauga, Texas. Landlord Cody Johnson later agreed not to evict Stedfast Baptist from the Watauga location after communicating with Stedfast's lawyer.

See also 
 Antisemitism in Christianity
 Christianity and homosexuality
 Dominion theology
 List of organizations designated by the Southern Poverty Law Center as anti-LGBT hate groups

References 

2017 establishments in the United States
Baptist denominations established in the 21st century
Late Modern Christian anti-Judaism
Anti-Zionist organizations
Anti-Zionism in the United States
Anti-Islam sentiment in the United States
Anti-Catholicism in the United States
Organizations that oppose LGBT rights in the United States
Anti-LGBT and Baptist churches
King James Only movement
Christian organizations established in 2017
Independent Baptist denominations